The 1906 Ohio Green and White football team was an American football team that represented Ohio University as an independent during the 1906 college football season. In its first season under head coach Arthur McFarland, the team compiled a 7–1 record and outscored opponents by a total of 158 to 28.

Schedule

References

Ohio
Ohio Bobcats football seasons
Ohio Green and White football